An Istituto tecnico superiore (abbreviated ITS – Higher Technical Institute) is an Italian tertiary educational institution. They were established in 2008, and are modelled on the Fachhochschule system of Germany. Programs have a duration of two or three years, and require a high school degree for access.

Course areas include business support services, agricultural and food industries, construction, mechanical engineering, and fashion. The northern region of Lombardy hosts the largest number of institutes.

See also
 University Institutes of Technology

References

External links
 Sistema ITS (in Italian)

Vocational education in Italy
Types of university or college
Higher education in Italy
Universities of Applied Sciences